Acanthacris ruficornis is a species of bird grasshopper in the family Acrididae. It is found in Africa and southern Europe.

Subspecies
These subspecies belong to the species Acanthacris ruficornis:
 Acanthacris ruficornis citrina (Serville, 1838)
 Acanthacris ruficornis ruficornis (Fabricius, 1787) (Garden Locust)

References

External links

 

Cyrtacanthacridinae